Bradley Alan Maynard (born February 9, 1974) is a former American football punter. He was drafted by the New York Giants in the third round of the 1997 NFL Draft, and has also been a member of the Chicago Bears, Houston Texans, and the Cleveland Browns.

Early years

Maynard was born in Tipton, Indiana.  He attended Sheridan High School in Hamilton County, Indiana, where he played high school football for the Blackhawks.

College career
Maynard attended Ball State University, where he played for the Ball State Cardinals football team.  He averaged 44.2 yards per kick, ranking third in NCAA history.  He amassed over 10,700 yards on 242 punts.  Maynard was named onto the consensus All-American selection and All-Mid-American Conference first-team pick.  He won MAC Defensive Player-of-the-Year and MVP following his senior campaign.  He majored in business while playing for the Cardinals.  He was described as quiet, humble, and hard working during his collegiate years.

Maynard was inducted into Ball State's Athletic Hall of Fame on February 8, 2008. On May 30, 2013, Maynard was inducted to the MAC Hall of Fame.

Professional career

New York Giants
The New York Giants selected Maynard in the third round of the 1997 NFL Draft, which made him one of the highest drafted punters in the modern era of football.  He was a member of the 2000 New York Giants, who played the Baltimore Ravens in Super Bowl XXXV.  Maynard set an NFL record for most punts in a single Super Bowl as the Giants lost 34–7.

Chicago Bears
After the 2000 season ended, Maynard became a free agent and signed with the Chicago Bears.

Maynard is known for his occasional trick plays. On rare occasions, he may pass in order to convert a first down.  His most notable trick play came in 2001, when he threw a 27-yard touchdown pass to Brian Urlacher on a fake field goal en route to a 20–15 victory over the Washington Redskins, which secured the Bears the NFC's second playoff seed.  He also threw passes on fake punts during two Bears' season finales in 2005 and 2006.  His career passing stats are 4-7 with two touchdowns.

In January 2007, he was voted the sexiest member of the Chicago Bears. Along with Patrick Mannelly, kicker Robbie Gould claims Maynard to be one of the Bears' unsung heroes. On July 25, 2011, the Bears released Maynard. Maynard was replaced with former Jacksonville Jaguars punter Adam Podlesh.

Houston Texans
On August 2, 2011 the Houston Texans signed Maynard to a 1-year deal. He was released on September 3, and replaced by the rookie Brett Hartmann after originally keeping Maynard and cutting Hartmann.

Cleveland Browns
On September 13, 2011, the Cleveland Browns signed Maynard to a one-year contract to replace the injured Richmond McGee. Following the season, he was not re-signed.

Personal life
He and his wife, Karen, have two sons, Conner and Cole, and a daughter, Ava.

While on the Bears, every Monday during football season he was featured on "Maynard Monday" with Eric and Kathy on 101.9 the Mix in Chicago where he discusses the previous Bears game. His wife was also featured on the segment after a bye week.

References

External links

 Official NFL player profile

1974 births
Living people
All-American college football players
American football punters
Ball State Cardinals football players
Chicago Bears players
Cleveland Browns players
Houston Texans players
New York Giants players
People from Tipton, Indiana
Players of American football from Indiana
People from Hamilton County, Indiana